Garkan Rural District is a rural district (dehestan) in Garkan-e Jonubi District, Mobarakeh County, Isfahan Province, Iran. At the 2006 census, its population was 8,892, in 2,344 families.  The rural district has 9 villages.

References 

Rural Districts of Isfahan Province
Mobarakeh County